Sampler is a surname. Notable people with the surname include:

 Marion Sampler (1920–1998), American designer
 Philece Sampler (1953–2021), American actress
 Samuel M. Sampler (1895–1979), United States Army soldier

See also
 Sample (surname)